Geikie Inlet is an inlet along the coast of Victoria Land, Antarctica, formed between the cliffs of the Drygalski Ice Tongue on the north and Lamplugh Island and the seaward extension of Clarke Glacier on the south. It was discovered by the British National Antarctic Expedition, 1901–04, under Robert Falcon Scott, who named it after Sir Archibald Geikie, who gave much assistance in preparing the expedition; Geikie Glacier was also named for him.

References

Inlets of Antarctica
Landforms of Victoria Land
Scott Coast